Vazhuvoor (or Vizhuvur) is one of the original styles of Bharatanatyam, a major form of Indian classical dance.

The main distinctive features include:

rich sringar elements
wide range of dancing pace
softer facial abhinaya
extremely elaborate movements
deep sitting positions
variety of positions on the floor

In the older, Pandanallur style pani, abhinaya is more ritualistic (i.e. in conformity with the rules as set by the ancient texts) than realistic, so the spectators are supposed know the rules to appreciate it. The Vazhuvur pani evolved later than the Pandanallur, and while this did not deviate from the rules of the performing arts treatise Natya Shastra, it adopted the abhinayas that were relatively more realistic. However, some contemporary Bharatanatyam dancers, such as seen in the external link below, have created several transitional sub-styles. This style of Bharatanatyam was made famous and was introduced by Vazhuvoor B. Ramiah Pillai and his ancestors.

More distinct characteristics

performance begins with a Thodaya mangalam in praise of Lord Gnana Sabesar of Vazhuvoor
the dancer starts the performance while entering the stage from the wings
static postures are performed, most often in the tillana, to break the monotony and to add the variety of rhythms 
the jatis have more korvais (intervals), which creates a suspense effect
the dancer's torso from the waist up is slightly bent forward
the adavus flow smoothly, with rare abrupt movements 
beautiful leaps are introduced into every jati
abhinaya is subtle with more natyadharmi (spontaneous expressions), so the presentation is not "overdone"
lasya dominates tandava

External links
Internet Archive video clips of predominantly Vazhuvoor style of Bharatanatyam

Dances of India